Kupec is a Czech and Slovak surname meaning "merchant". Notable people with the surname include:

 C. J. Kupec (born 1953), American basketball player.
 Martin Kupec (born 1988), Czech ice hockey player.
 Šimon Kupec (born 1996), Slovak footballer.

See also
 

Czech-language surnames
Slovak-language surnames
Occupational surnames